HFX may refer to:

HFX Wanderers FC, a Canadian professional soccer club in Halifax, Nova Scotia
Halifax International Security Forum, organization headquartered in Washington, D.C., United States
Halifax railway station (England), National Rail code HFX, railway station in West Yorkshire, England